Gustav Müller may refer to:
 Gustav Müller (astronomer) (1851–1925), German astronomer
 Gustav Müller (serial killer) (1865–?), German bigamist, murderer and serial killer
 Gustav Wilhelm Müller (1857–1940), German zoologist
 Gustl Müller (1903–1989), German Nordic combined and cross-country skier

See also
 Gustave Mueller (disambiguation)